Love, American Style is a US comedic television anthology.

Love, American Style or Love American Style may also refer to:
 "Love American Style" (Dexter), an episode of the US television series Dexter
 Love American Style, an EP by the Beastie Boys featuring the song "Hey Ladies" 
 Love American Style (album), an album by noise rock band The Honeymoon Killers